Lubomira Bacheva (born 7 March 1975) is a retired tennis player from Bulgaria. She reached her career-high ranking of world No. 68 on 1 November 1999.

Tennis career
As a junior, Bacheva won the European Championships in 1989 and 1991.

Bacheva turned professional in 1990 and spent several years on the ITF Women's Circuit building up her ranking. In 1999, she finally broke through the top 100 and reached her first WTA Tour semifinal at the Estoril Open as a lucky loser. She finished that year at No. 73. She finished 2000 again in the top 100. In 2001, she beat Chanda Rubin for her career best win. She played her last professional match in 2004—a first-round loss to Dally Randriantefy in an ITF event.

Bacheva won no WTA Tour singles titles, but did win two doubles titles in Casablanca and Budapest, respectively. She was a member of the Bulgarian Fed Cup team from 1993 to 1996 with a win–loss record of 1–6.

Grand Slam performance timeline

Singles

Doubles

WTA career finals

Doubles: 4 (2 titles, 2 runner–ups)

ITF Circuit finals

Singles: 25 (9 titles, 16 runner–ups)

Doubles: 28 (11 titles, 17 runner–ups)

 w/o = walkover

Fed Cup
Lubomira Bacheva debuted for the Bulgaria Fed Cup team in 1993. She has a 0–4 singles and a 1–2 doubles record (1–6 overall).

Singles (0–4)

Doubles (1–2)

 RPO = Relegation Play–off

References

External links
 
 
 

1975 births
Living people
Bulgarian female tennis players
Sportspeople from Sofia